Homewood is an English surname. Notable people with the surname include:

John Homewood (1932–1991), English football referee
Roy Homewood, American football player and coach
Thomas Homewood (1881–1945), British tug of war competitor
William Homewood (1920–1989), British politician

English-language surnames